Inverness Caledonian Thistle F.C. in their ninth season in the Scottish Football League competed in the Scottish First Division, Scottish League Cup, Scottish Challenge Cup and the Scottish Cup in season 2002–03.

Results

Scottish First Division

Final League table

Scottish League Cup

Scottish Challenge Cup

Scottish Cup

Hat-tricks

References
caleythistleonline

Inverness Caledonian Thistle F.C. seasons
Inverness